Pallante is a surname. Notable people with the surname include:

 Aladdin Pallante (1912–1970), American actor and musician
 Andre Pallante (born 1998), American baseball player
 Maria Pallante (born 1964), American attorney
 Pablo Pallante  (born 1979), Uruguayan footballer